Timeline of anthropology, 1890–1899

Events

1898
The Cambridge Anthropological Expedition to the Torres Straits

Publications

1897
Le Suicide by Émile Durkheim

Births
1891
Pedro Bosch-Gimpera
Herman Karl Haberlin
Zora Neale Hurston
Abram Kardiner
Géza Róheim

1897
Theodora Kroeber
George Peter Murdock
Robert Redfield
Benjamin Whorf
1898
Ruth Bunzel
Carolyn Bond Day
Marcel Griaule
William Lloyd Warner
1899
Daniel Garrison Brinton
Ella Cara Deloria
Walter Dyk
Anna Hardwick Gayton
Audrey Richards

Deaths

Anthropology by decade
Anthropology
Anthropology timelines
1890s decade overviews